Heike Raab (born 8 April 1965) is a German politician (SPD), currently serving as Deputy Minister of the Interior, for Sports and Infrastructure of the state of Rhineland-Palatinate.

Early life and education 
 1984: Abitur (high school diploma), Hilda Gymnasium Koblenz (high school)
 1984 – 1987: Degree course for physical therapy, Technical University of Aachen, Germany 
 1988 – 1992: University studies (M.A. degree): Political Sciences, Public Law and Spanish

Career 
 1992 – 1993: Research Assistant for the German Federal Parliament (Deutscher Bundestag) 
 1993 – 1994: State Chancellery, personal assistant of the Minister-President Rudolf Scharping
 1994 – 1998: Personal assistant of the Chairman of the Social Democratic Party in the Deutsche Bundestag, Rudolf Scharping
 1999 – 2001: Head of Division in the State Chancellery of Rhineland-Palatinate 
 since 18 May 2011: Undersecretary/ Deputy Minister of the Interior, for Sports and Infrastructure

As one of the state's representatives at the Bundesrat since 2015, Raab serves on the Committee on European Affairs. She is also a member of the German-Polish Friendship Group set up by the Bundesrat and the Senate of Poland.

Political positions
 1989: Member of the Social Democratic Party
 2000: Chairwoman of the county chapter of the Social Democrats in Cochem-Zell County 
 2001 – 2011: Member of Parliament, Rhineland-Palatinate 
 2004: Chairwoman of the Social Democratic parliamentary group in the County Council of Cochem-Zell 
 2006 – 2011: Secretary-General of the Social Democratic Party in Rhineland-Palatinate

Other activities

Corporate boards
 KfW, Ex-Officio Member of the Board of Supervisory Directors (since 2021)

Non-profit organizations
 ZDF, Member of the Program Committee
 Schüler Helfen Leben, Member of the Board of Trustees

External links 
 Website of Heike Raab

References

1965 births
Living people
People from Cochem
Members of the Landtag of Rhineland-Palatinate
Social Democratic Party of Germany politicians